Jean Gehret (January 10, 1900, Geneva, Switzerland - May 24, 1956, Paris, France) was an actor and director, appearing in a few films directed by Jean Renoir, including La Chienne (1931) and Madame Bovary (1933).

Filmography

External links

1900 births
1956 deaths
Swiss male film actors
Film people from Geneva
20th-century Swiss male actors
Actors from Geneva